Ann Barner (born 1950), is a female retired swimmer who competed for England.

Swimming career
She represented England and won two bronze medals in the butterfly events, at the 1966 British Empire and Commonwealth Games in Kingston, Jamaica.

At the ASA National British Championships she won the 110 yards butterfly title in 1966 and 1967  and the 220 yards butterfly title in 1966 and 1967. During 1966 edition she broke 18 British or English records in a six-week period and beat three records when winning the National Championships.

References

1950 births
English female swimmers
Commonwealth Games medallists in swimming
Commonwealth Games bronze medallists for England
Swimmers at the 1966 British Empire and Commonwealth Games
Living people
20th-century English women
Medallists at the 1966 British Empire and Commonwealth Games